A reference route is an unsigned highway assigned by the New York State Department of Transportation (NYSDOT) to roads that possess a signed name (mainly parkways), that NYSDOT has determined are too minor to have a signed touring route number, or are former touring routes that are still state-maintained. The majority of reference routes are owned by the state of New York and maintained by NYSDOT; however, some exceptions exist. The reference route designations are normally posted on reference markers, small green signs located every tenth-mile on the side of the road, though a few exceptions exist to this practice as well.

Reference route numbers are always three digit numbers in the 900s with a single alphabetic suffix. The designations are largely assigned in numerical and alphabetical order within a region, and designations are not reused once they are removed. Certain letters are avoided, such as "I" (used to indicate Interstate Highways and potential confusion with the number 1), "N" (used for institutional roads), "O" (potential confusion with the number 0), "R" (used for reservation roads), "S" (potential confusion with the number 5), "X" (a designation sometimes used in region 10), "Y", and "Z" (at the end of alphabet and not used). "Q" and "U" are not currently being assigned due to confusion in the past. Designations are assigned as follows:
The first digit is 9, distinguishing the number as a reference route designation.
The second digit corresponds to the NYSDOT region number the route is in, with regions 10 and 11 using the digit 0.
The third digit is 6 for collector/distributor roads along limited access highways, 7–9 for parkways, and 0–5 for all other roads.

An older system of reference route numbering used numbers ranging from 800 to 999 without an alphabetic suffix. Some reference markers with these older numbers still exist, even though these reference routes have new numbers. Every road maintained by NYSDOT also has a state highway (SH) number, used in state laws.

Region 1
NYSDOT Region 1 primarily covers the Capital District, Saratoga–Champlain and Upper Hudson Valley areas. The counties comprising this region are Albany, Essex, Greene, Rensselaer, Saratoga, Schenectady, Warren, and Washington.

Region 2
Region 2 primarily covers the Central, Mohawk Valley, and south-central Adirondack areas of New York. The counties comprising this region are Fulton, Hamilton, Herkimer, Madison, Montgomery, and Oneida.

Region 3
Region 3 primarily covers the eastern Finger Lakes area. The counties comprising this region are Cayuga, Cortland, Onondaga, Oswego, Seneca, and Tompkins.

Region 4
Region 4 primarily covers the western Finger Lakes and Genesee Valley areas. The counties comprising this region are Genesee, Livingston, Monroe, Ontario, Orleans, Wayne, and Wyoming.

Region 5
Region 5 primarily covers the Niagara Frontier and southwestern New York. The counties comprising this region are Cattaraugus, Chautauqua, Erie, and Niagara.

Region 6
Region 6 primarily covers the western and central portions of the Southern Tier. The counties comprising this region are Allegany, Chemung, Schuyler, Steuben, and Yates.  Reference routes for Tioga County are also listed here, as Tioga County was in Region 6 until August 2007.

Region 7
Region 7 primarily covers the North Country and the northern portion of the Adirondacks. The counties comprising this region are Clinton, Franklin, Jefferson, Lewis, and St. Lawrence.

Region 8
Region 8 primarily covers the Middle and Lower Hudson Valley. The counties comprising this region are Columbia, Dutchess, Orange, Putnam, Rockland, Ulster, and Westchester.

Region 9
Region 9 primarily covers the eastern Southern Tier and the Central Leatherstocking and Catskill regions. The counties comprising this region are Broome, Chenango, Delaware, Otsego, Schoharie, and Sullivan. Region 9 also includes Tioga County; however, the reference routes in Tioga County have designations corresponding to Region 6 since the county was part of Region 6 when the routes were assigned.

Regions 10 and 11
Regions 10 and 11 collectively cover the core of Downstate New York, with Region 10 covering Long Island and Region 11 covering New York City. As such, Nassau and Suffolk counties comprise Region 10 and the five boroughs of New York City—The Bronx, Brooklyn (Kings County), Manhattan (New York County), Queens, and Staten Island (Richmond County)—comprise Region 11.

References
General references

New York State Department of Transportation, Traffic Data Report, July 22, 2015
New York State Department of Transportation, 1:24,000 Digital Raster Quadrangles: shows the SH numbers
Empire State Roads - Reference Routes
NYSDOT information on reference markers
New York State Roadway Inventory System Viewer
2017 New York State Department of Transportation Statewide Pavement Data Report

Inline references

 
Lists of roads in New York (state)